FC Progress Chernyakhovsk is a Russian football team from Chernyakhovsk. It played professionally from 1990 to 1993. Their best result was 8th place in Zone 5 of the Russian Second Division in 1993.

In 1990 they played in the Baltic League.

They currently play in Kaliningrad Region Supreme League

See also
 Yorck Boyen Insterburg - a team that played in Chernyakhovsk (then Insterburg) when it was part of Germany.

External links
  Team history at KLISF

Association football clubs established in 1960
Association football clubs disestablished in 1994
Defunct football clubs in Russia
Sport in Kaliningrad Oblast
1960 establishments in Russia
1994 disestablishments in Russia